Cosmosoma galatea is a moth of the family Erebidae. It was described by William Schaus in 1912. It is found in Costa Rica and Peru.

References

galatea
Moths described in 1912